The Chathannoor Sree Bhoothanatha Temple is a famous temple and tourist attraction in Chathannoor. The Nedum Kuthira of Chathannoor Sree Bhoothanatha Temple on the festival is the one of  biggest of its kind in South Kerala. Festivals in these temples also attract people from other places. The biggest festival temple in Chathannoor, Kollam is Sree Bhoothanatha Temple Utsavam.

References

External links
 

Hindu temples in Kollam district